Christiaan Bezuidenhout (born 18 May 1994) is a South African professional golfer who is a three-time winner on the European Tour. He won the 2019 Estrella Damm N.A. Andalucía Masters and, in consecutive weeks, the 2020 Alfred Dunhill Championship and 2020 South African Open.

Amateur career
As an amateur, Bezuidenhout received a drug suspension after testing positive for beta blockers at the 2014 Amateur Championship. Bezuidenhout was using them for anxiety and a stutter after an accidental poisoning at the age of two. The suspension was originally for two years but was later reduced to nine months.

Professional career
Bezuidenhout turned professional in early 2015. He had success in September 2015 winning two 36-hole events on the Big Easy Tour, losing in a playoff for the Big Easy Tour Championship and also winning the Order of Merit.

In December 2015, Bezuidenhout won the Sunshine Tour Q School. In the first event of the season, the 2016 BMW SA Open, co-sanctioned with the European Tour, he finished runner-up to Brandon Stone. Later in 2016, he won a smaller tournament on the Sunshine Tour, the Sun Fish River Challenge, and finished runner-up in the Vodacom Origins of Golf Final. Bezuidenhout started 2017 with 5th-place finishes in both the Eye of Africa PGA Championship and the Dimension Data Pro-Am. He was the 2016–17 Sunshine Tour Rookie of the Year, awarded the Bobby Locke Trophy.

Bezuidenhout played several 2017 Challenge Tour events. He finished tied for 25th place in the European Tour Q-School to gain a place on the main tour for 2018. Bezuidenhout made the cut in 20 of his 26 2018 European Tour starts. His best finish was tied for 17th place, and he finished 105th in the Order of Merit, just retaining his card for 2019.

Bezuidenhout was one of nine runners-up in the 2019 Commercial Bank Qatar Masters behind Justin Harding. He also tied for 4th place in the Hero Indian Open and third place in the BMW International Open. The following week he won the Estrella Damm N.A. Andalucía Masters and with the win earned entry into the 2019 Open Championship. He was third in the 2019 BMW PGA Championship to enter the world top 100 for the first time and finished the season 18th in the European Tour Order of Merit.

In January 2020, Bezuidenhout lost in a sudden death playoff at the Omega Dubai Desert Classic to Lucas Herbert. Playing his final hole, he held the outright lead but found the water with his third shot resulting in a bogey finish. He lost the playoff to a birdie on the second extra hole. The following month he won the Dimension Data Pro-Am in South Africa and advanced into the top 50 on the Official World Golf Ranking. Bezuidenhout trailed by a stroke coming to the final hole but made an eagle 3 to beat George Coetzee by one.

In November 2020, Bezuidenhout won the Alfred Dunhill Championship at Leopard Creek Country Club. A final round 69 was good enough to help him win by four shots. 54-hole leader Adrian Meronk let his lead slide by shooting a final round 76. A week later, Bezuidenhout claimed a wire-to-wire victory at the South African Open which was played at Gary Player Country Club. He became the first player with back-to-back victories on the European Tour since Justin Rose in 2017.

Bezuidenhout recorded his best finish on the PGA Tour in July 2022. He finished tied-second at the John Deere Classic, three shots behind J. T. Poston. This result also gave him a place in the 2022 Open Championship.

In September 2022, Bezuidenhout was selected for the International team in the 2022 Presidents Cup; he played two matches, winning one and tying the other.

Professional wins (10)

European Tour wins (3)

1Co-sanctioned by the Sunshine Tour

European Tour playoff record (0–1)

Sunshine Tour wins (4)

1Co-sanctioned by the Challenge Tour
2Co-sanctioned by the European Tour

Big Easy Tour wins (2)

IGT Pro Tour wins (3)

Results in major championships
Results not in chronological order in 2020.

CUT = missed the half-way cut
"T" indicates a tie for a place
NT = No tournament due to COVID-19 pandemic

Results in The Players Championship

"T" indicates a tie for a place

Results in World Golf Championships

1Cancelled due to COVID-19 pandemic

NT = No tournament
"T" = Tied
Note that the Championship and Invitational were discontinued from 2022.

Team appearances
Professional
Presidents Cup (representing the International team): 2022

See also
2017 European Tour Qualifying School graduates
2021 Korn Ferry Tour Finals graduates

References

External links

South African male golfers
Sunshine Tour golfers
European Tour golfers
PGA Tour golfers
Olympic golfers of South Africa
Golfers at the 2020 Summer Olympics
Golfers from Johannesburg
Doping cases in golf
People from Victor Khanye Local Municipality
Afrikaner people
1994 births
Living people